The 2021–22 Italian Hockey League - Serie A was the 88th season of the Serie A, the top level of ice hockey in Italy. 7 teams participated in the league, and Asiago Hockey won the championship.

Teams 
The teams licensed to play in the Italian Hockey League - Serie A 2021–22 are the seven Italian teams playing the 2021-22 Alps Hockey League.

Regular season

Results 

Source:Italian Hockey League

Final round

Results

Final rankings

References

External links 
 Italian Hockey League official website
 Elite Prospects
 Eurohockey

Ita
Serie A
Serie A (ice hockey) seasons